Lords of the Realm II (also known as Lords 2) is a computer game published by Sierra On-Line and developed by Impressions Games. It was first released for the PC in 1996, and is the second game in the Lords of the Realm series.

The game takes place in a medieval setting, with rulers of several counties warring for the right to be king of the land. Players grow crops, accumulate resources, manufacture weapons, manage armies, build and lay siege to castles, capture provinces, and ultimately attempt to conquer their enemies.

Gameplay 
Lords of the Realm II is very different from many medieval strategy games. There is no magic, and unlike many strategy games, it has no technology tree. Players need to carefully manage food (cows, dairy, grain), population, and happiness levels whilst avoiding Malthusian population meltdowns or other players invading their counties. The game is a combination of a turn-based resource management game, in which players grow crops, accumulate resources, manufacture weapons, manage armies, and build and lay siege to castles; and a real-time strategy game with players controlling units individually or in group formations in battles or during sieges.

Compared to the original, Lords of the Realm II features updated graphics and an improved management system.

Development
Impressions Games general manager David Lester commented during development, "We wanted the game to be more multiplayer friendly, and one way to do that was by adding realtime combat. Besides, when you can bring a castle down by aiming a battering ram or a catapult at it in realtime, it's a lot more satisfying."

Reception

Sales
In the United States, Lords of the Realm II debuted in 16th place on PC Data's computer game sales rankings for December 1996. It rose to #9 in January, and it remained in the firm's top 20 for another two months, before dropping out in April. Returning to the top 20 in May and June, Lords of the Realm II became the 14th-best-selling computer game in the United States during 1997's first half. It exited PC Data's monthly top 20 after a placement of 19th in July. By November, global sales of Lords of the Realm II had surpassed 350,000 copies.

Lords of the Realm II went on to be the 19th-biggest computer game seller of 1998, with 245,324 in sales and $2.99 million in revenues. Its total sales ultimately reached 2.5 million copies worldwide.

Critical reviews

Tim Soete of GameSpot called Lords of the Realm II "a challenging and entertaining experience for strategy enthusiasts." However, he opined that the game was overambitious in its real-time combat aspect, with troops that are difficult to maneuver and battlefields that tend to become overcrowded. A Next Generation critic found it "simply an outstanding upgrade and improvement over the already excellent original." He particularly emphasized the realistic economic model, such as the fact that building an army requires drafting peasants from the population, with a resultant drop in village morale, whereas in most such games armies are built from a separate and unlimited stock of potential soldiers. Like Soete, he saw problems in the combat, such as the enemy AI's ineptitude at siege warfare, but deemed them minor issues.

Sequels 
Lords of the Realm II: Siege Pack (released June 13, 1997) is an expansion pack consisting of new combat scenarios and additional maps. It was followed by a spin-off, Lords of Magic, and a sequel, Lords of the Realm III.

References

External links 
 Lords of the Realm II at MobyGames
 Lords of the Realm II at GameFAQs

1996 video games
DOS games
Classic Mac OS games
Multiplayer and single-player video games
Turn-based strategy video games
Video game sequels
Video games developed in the United Kingdom
Video games scored by Keith Zizza
Video games set in castles
Video games set in medieval England
Video games with isometric graphics
Video games with expansion packs
Windows games
Impressions Games games
Sierra Entertainment games